The women's competition in the flyweight (– 48 kg) division was held on 5 November 2011.

Schedule

Medalists

Records

 Nurcan Taylan's world record was rescinded in 2021.

Results

References

(Pages 20, 21 & 23) Start List 
2011 IWF World Championships Results Book Pages 8–10 
Results

2011 World Weightlifting Championships
World